Our Ukraine (Ukrainian: Наша Україна — Nasha Ukraina or Nasha Ukrayina) is a popular political name in Ukraine during the Orange Revolution.

Our Ukraine may refer to:
 Reforms and Order Party (before 2005)
 Our Ukraine (political party) (after 2005)
 Our Ukraine Bloc for the Ukrainian parliamentary election, 2006
 for the 2002 Ukrainian parliamentary election, Bloc of Viktor Yushchenko "Our Ukraine"
 for the Ukrainian parliamentary election, 2007, Our Ukraine–People's Self-Defense Bloc

Politics of Ukraine